was a Japanese politician who served as governor of Hiroshima Prefecture from September 1925 to September 1926. He was governor of Toyama Prefecture (1910-1915), Miyagi Prefecture (1915-1919) and Kyoto Prefecture (1926-1927).

References

Governors of Hiroshima
1870 births
1945 deaths
Japanese Home Ministry government officials
Governors of Toyama Prefecture
Governors of Miyagi Prefecture
Governors of Kyoto